The Research Institute of the Finnish Economy, commonly known by its Finnish acronym ETLA, is a prominent Finnish think tank for economic, policy and social studies. ETLA was established in 1946, and is based in Helsinki.

ETLA has published approximately 250 books and 600 other research publications. Its quarterly economic trends and forecasts analysis of the Finnish economy named "The Finnish Economy and Society" is the most reputed such publication in Finland.

ETLA is a non-profit organisation funded by members such as the Confederation of Finnish Industries, as well as by Academy of Finland, Nordic Council of Ministers and the European Commission, among others.

As of 2019, the managing director of ETLA is Dr Aki Kangasharju, who previously held the position of Chief Economist at Nordea.

References

External links 

Economy of Finland
Think tanks based in Finland
Research institutes in Finland